Enteromius musumbi is a species of ray-finned fish in the genus Enteromius which is endemic to Angola.

References 

 

Endemic fauna of Angola
Enteromius
Taxa named by George Albert Boulenger
Fish described in 1910